2084: Il potere dell'immortalità nelle città del dolore is an Italian-language dystopian science fiction novel written by the Italian writer Menotti Lerro. It was published in November 2013 by Zona Publishing.

Plot
Twenty-Eighty Four is divided into 3 chapters. The story takes place in an imagined future, starting in the year 2084, when the doctor Andrew Robinson discovers the "pill of pain" (to not feel physical pain anymore) and "the pill of life" which permits humans to live forever, staying young.   
2084 was inspired by George Orwell's Nineteen-Eighty Four but the plot is completely different, wondering on what would happen to people if they would find the medicine to live an eternal life on earth.

Critical reception

The book has been analyzed by Francesco D’Episcopo from Federico II University in the volume Menotti Lerro, Tra Drammaturgia e Narrativa (Genesi: 2019). In addition, on the magazine IF (Insolito e Fantastico) Maria Teresa Chialant from Salerno University highlighted the modernity of this novel.

References

Bibliography
Francesco D'Episcopo, Menotti Lerro. Tra drammaturgia e narrativa, Genesi 2019 
Maria Teresa Chialant, "2084: Il potere dell'immortalità nelle città del dolore", in: IF Magazine, a. VIII, numero 20, dicembre 2016, pp. 164–165. 
Andrea Vitale, "La distopia secondo Menotti Lerro", in: Fantascienza.com ISSN 1974-8248

External links 
Official Page

2013 Italian novels
2013 science fiction novels
Satirical novels
Dystopian novels
Italian science fiction novels
Novels about totalitarianism
Novels set in the future
Social science fiction
Political novels